Radosław Paweł Murawski (born 22 April 1994) is a Polish professional footballer who plays as a midfielder for Lech Poznań.

Career statistics

Honours
Lech Poznań
 Ekstraklasa: 2021–22

References

External links
 
 
 

1994 births
Living people
Sportspeople from Gliwice
Polish footballers
Poland youth international footballers
Poland under-21 international footballers
Association football midfielders
Piast Gliwice players
Palermo F.C. players
Denizlispor footballers
Lech Poznań players
Lech Poznań II players
Ekstraklasa players
I liga players
II liga players
Serie B players
Süper Lig players
Polish expatriate footballers
Expatriate footballers in Italy
Expatriate footballers in Turkey
Polish expatriate sportspeople in Italy
Polish expatriate sportspeople in Turkey